The Yemenite ambassador to the Court of St James's is the official representative of the Government in Aden to the Government of the United Kingdom in London.

List of ambassadors

South Yemen 
South Yemen

List of ambassadors

References

United Kingdom
Yemen
Ambassadors